The 1947 Argentine Primera División was the 56th season of top-flight football in Argentina. The season began on April 13 and ended on November 16.

Banfield returned to Primera while Atlanta was relegated. River Plate won its 9th title.

League standings

References

Argentine Primera División seasons
Argentine Primera Division
Primera Division